Horizon Christian School may refer to:

 Horizon Christian School (Hood River, Oregon)
 Horizon Christian School (Tualatin, Oregon)